The American University of Iraq – Baghdad (AUIB) is a private, not-for-profit university established in 2018. It started its teaching activities in February 2021 with 260 students in three colleges: Arts & Sciences, International Studies, and Business. The campus has grown quickly with the addition of five more colleges (Pharmacy, Dentistry, Health Technologies, Nursing, and Law).

History
The university opened in February, 2021. It models itself on other regional American-style liberal arts universities such as the American University of Beirut and the American University of Cairo.

In 2017, after deciding the location, the United States Ambassador to Iraq signed an agreement that would pave the way for the university. Its inaugural class in 2021 comprised approximately three hundred undergraduates. Most of this cohort took English language skills courses at the university's English Language Academy before embarking on their baccalaureate programs.

Campus
The university's campus is located in what was previously Saddam Hussein’s Al Faw Palace. The palace was built in the 1990s. The grounds belong to the Iraqi government, which is set to lease its facilities to the university on a fifty-year basis. The university has the option to extend the lease for another fifty years when the current lease expires.  
The campus consists of palaces and attached houses; it spans 643 acres (2.6 km2), and has a campus bus service. Diverted water from the Tigris River fills its lakes which some claim contain a unique species of large bass.
Hussein’s initials remain etched on into the ceilings, columns, and walls.

Funding and motivation
A founder's message on the institution's website reads, "I am Saadi Saihood and my sons and I have made it our family’s mission to usher our country out of its legacy of terrorism and turbulence."

So far, the founders have spent $200 million on renovations and refurbishments.

The institution's website posits, “To be truly American, a university must adopt not only English as its language of instruction but also the culture and ethos of higher education in the United States as recognized through U.S. accreditation.”

Academic profile
The university's president, Michael Mulnix, claims the university offers, “an American model of education focusing on the liberal arts,” 
Before starting their majors, the university's students spend two years studying philosophy, sociology, psychology, and world history.

College of Arts and Sciences

College of Business

College of International Studies

College of Healthcare Technologies

Other colleges listed on the university's website are; College of Law, College of Pharmacy, College of Dentistry and College of Nursing.

See also
 American University of Iraq, Sulaimani
 American University of Beirut (AUB)
 American University in Dubai (AUD)

References

External links
 new american-university-of-iraq-baghdad-aims-to-train-future-leaders

Private universities and colleges
Universities in Iraq